Ganna Pustovarova (born 1993) is an Uzbekistani weightlifter, competing in the +75 kg category and representing Uzbekistan in international competitions. 

She competed at world championships, most recently at the 2010 World Weightlifting Championships.

Major results

References

1993 births
Living people
Uzbekistani female weightlifters
Place of birth missing (living people)
Weightlifters at the 2010 Summer Youth Olympics
21st-century Uzbekistani women